The women's triple jump at the 2013 World Championships in Athletics was held at the Luzhniki Stadium on 13–15 August.

Defending champion Olha Saladuha was the leading qualifier, but it took her two attempts to get there.  Irina Gumenyuk and world leader Caterine Ibargüen took care of business on their first attempts.  Saladuha's former Ukrainian teammate Hanna Knyazyeva-Minenko, now competing for Israel, suffered through two fouls before popping the No. 3 qualifier on her last attempt.

In the final, Saladuha took the first round lead, with Knyazyeva-Minenko leading a crowd of four hovering around 14.30.  In the second round, the event was decided.  First the home team's Ekaterina Koneva put one out at 14.81 to take the lead.  Two jumps later, Ibargüen improved on her world leading jump of the year by going 14.85, just 4 cm further.  Two jumps after that, Saladuha improved out to 14.65.  That turned out to be it, but nobody knew it.  Ibargüen continued with a 14.83 in the fourth round, which turned out to be the second best of the competition and watched nervously as Koneva tickled her best with a 14.79 in the fifth.  But the lead held up and Ibargüen took home Colombia's first World Championship gold medal to go along with the bronzes she and racewalker Luis Lopez earned in Daegu.

Records
Prior to the competition, the records were as follows:

Schedule

Results

Qualification
Qualification: Qualifying Performance 14.30 (Q) or at least 12 best performers (q) advance to the final.

Final

The final was started at 19:40.

References

External links
Triple jump results at IAAF website

Triple jump
Triple jump at the World Athletics Championships
2013 in women's athletics